Midland Province was an electoral province of the Legislative Council of Western Australia between 1950 and 1965. It elected three members throughout its existence.

Members

References
 David Black (2014), The Western Australian Parliamentary Handbook (Twenty-Third Edition), pp. 221–222, 225

Former electoral provinces of Western Australia
1950 establishments in Australia
1965 disestablishments in Australia